"Hype Boy" is a Korean-language song and the second single recorded by South Korean girl group NewJeans from their debut extended play (EP), New Jeans. It was released by ADOR on July 23, 2022, as one of the EP's lead singles.

Background and release
A day after the release of their debut single "Attention", it was announced that NewJeans would be releasing debut self-titled extended play (EP) on August 1, 2022. The EP was confirmed to contain four tracks, including two additional singles. On July 23, NewJeans released their second single, "Hype Boy", accompanied by a 50-second introductory clip revealing the members and four additional music videos specific to each member.

Composition and lyrics 
Gigi, Ylva Dimberg, and NewJeans member Hanni contributed to the lyrics of "Hype Boy", while Dimberg and 250 served as producers. The song, written in Korean and English, has a running time of 2 minutes and 56 seconds and is composed in the key of E minor, with a tempo of 100 beats per minute.

Critical reception 
Carmen Chin of NME wrote in a review for the group's EP New Jeans that "Hype Boy" eschews the "slow-jam nostalgia" of the preceding single "Attention" and "instead invokes contemporary reimaginations of 2000s sounds with its tropical touches and future bass," and "the way these elements are arranged make for a dreamy, almost hazy atmosphere." Subsequently, NME placed "Hype Boy" at number 1 on their list of the 25 best K-pop songs of 2022. In December 2022, Rolling Stone placed "Hype Boy" at number 24 on their list of the top 100 best songs of 2022, highlighting it as a "standout" from the group's EP with "its addictive choreography and catchy chorus". Time named it one of the best K-pop songs of the year.

Promotion 
On August 4, NewJeans held their debut stage on Mnet's M Countdown, where they performed all three lead singles from their self-titled EP, including "Hype Boy".

Charts

Weekly charts

Monthly charts

Year-end charts

Certifications

Release history

References

NewJeans songs
2022 songs
2022 singles
Korean-language songs
Hybe Corporation singles